Storekvina station is a railway station on the Sørlandet Line situated at Storekvina in Kvinesdal, Norway. Located  from Oslo Central Station, it is served by long-distance trains operated by Go-Ahead Norge. In addition to intercity services to Oslo and Stavanger, the eight daily trains in each direction serve as a commuter link to Kristiansand, located an hour away.

The station was opened on 17 December 1943 as part of the segment of the Sørlandet Line between Kristiasand and Sira. The line past the station was electrified from 18 February 1944. It received a station building designed by Gudmund Hoel. Although previously possessing a passing loop, the station was bypassed in the automatic train control installation in 1969. The side tracks have since been removed and the station has been unstaffed since 1986. Storekvina had 32,100 passengers in 2008.

History

Storekvina Station was built during the Second World War under the German-administrated expansion of the Sørlandet Line west of Kristiansand. The station building was completed in 1942 after designs by Gudmund Hoel at NSB Arkitektkontor. It was originally proposed to be named Stor-Kvina, but this was changed to Storekvina. Irregular revenue traffic commenced on the line on 17 December 1943 and the station became operative from the same day. Electric traction was introduced on 18 February 1944, ahead of ordinary traffic commencing on 1 March 1944.

The Sørlandet Line received automatic train control from 1969. Storekvina never received an interlocking system and the former passing loop was officially taken out of use from 1 June 1969. The station remained staffed for sale of tickets and handling cargo until 1 June 1986.

Facilities

The station is located just west of the  Gyland Tunnel, which runs almost the entire distance to Gyland Station.

Like the other stations along the Sørlandet Line, the station building received a standardized design. It was built in the overall Neoclassical architecture style adapted in the 1920s. By the 1940s the designs had been altered to include elements of Functionalism. The station building, designed by Gudmund Hoel, was identical to the one at Audnedal Station. The  building is wooden with a concrete foundation. It has siding in wood and a gable roof. The building consists of a main section, where the lower story originally featured a ticketing and waiting room, and an upper story with the station master's residence. The annex was allocated cargo handling.

Today the station building features a waiting room and washrooms, open around the clock except from 21:00 on Saturday to 07:00 on Sunday. There is free parking for 30 cars at the station, as well as parking facilities for bicycles.

Services
The station is served by long-distance trains operated by Go-Ahead, counting eight daily services on weekdays, including a night train service. These operate from Oslo via Kristiansand to Stavanger. Travel time is about one hour to Kristiansand, two hours to Stavanger and less than five hours to Oslo.

The station had 32,100 annual passengers in 2008. The catchment area of Storekvina Station covers the municipalities of Kvinesdal and Farsund. The station is situated north of the administrative center of Liknes. Agder Kollektivtrafikk operates a shuttle service to the village in connection with the train services. This must be ordered at least two hours in advance.

References

Railway stations in Agder
Railway stations on the Sørlandet Line
Railway stations opened in 1943
1943 establishments in Norway
Kvinesdal